Piotr Cugowski (born 5 October 1979, in Lublin) is a Polish musician, vocalist of the Bracia Group, which he founded together with his brother Wojciech. He comes from a musical family, being the son of Krzysztof Cugowski, who is the founder of a well known Polish 1970's rock band Budka Suflera. Piotr Cugowski is a member of the Polish Society of the Phonographic Industry.

Career
Piotr Cugowski began his musical career in 1997. A breakthrough came in 2002 when he won the main prize at the Festival in Zielona Gora for his performance of the song by Czesław Niemen entitled "One heart", (Polish: "Jednego serca"). The most famous songs which Piotr Cugowski performed with his band Bracia include: "Za szkłem", "Nad Przepaścią", "Wierzę w lepszy świat" and "Po drugiej stronie chmur".

For the past three years (2015 to 2018) Piotr Cugowski and his brother Wojciech Cugowski (guitar, vocal) together with their father Krzysztof Cugowski created the Cugowski music project. They gave hundreds of concerts throughout Poland promoting the common album "Cugowscy".

In September 2018 Piotr Cugowski debuted in the role of juror in the ninth season of The Voice of Poland. He will release his first solo album for his 40th birthday in 2019. The first single from the album titled "Kto nie kochal" (English: "Who never loved") premiered in Poland on October 23, 2018.

On August 18, 2021, it was announced that he will appear in the third season of The Voice Senior as a coach, replacing Andrzej Piaseczny.

Personal life

Piotr Cugowski's wife is Eliza Tokarczyk, a TV journalist. They got married in 2008. In 2011, their son Piotr came to the world.

Discography

 Bracia (Cugowscy) - Zmienić zdarzeń bieg (2013)
 Bracia (Cugowscy) - Missing Every Moment (2003)
 Bracia (Cugowscy) - Nie jestem inny (2002)
 Cugowscy - Zaklęty krąg (2016)
 Bracia (Cugowscy) - Zmienić zdarzeń bieg (2015)
 Bracia (Cugowscy) - Zapamiętaj (2009)
 Bracia (Cugowscy) - Kolędy (2009)
 Bracia (Cugowscy) - You Don't Fool Me (2008)
 Bracia (Cugowscy) - Szara twarz (2004)
 Bracia (Cugowscy) - Niczego więcej (2004)
 Bracia (Cugowscy) - Jeszcze raz (2007)
 Seweryn Krajewski - Jak tam jest (2011)
 Bracia (Cugowscy) - Tribute to Queen (2008)
 Martyna Jakubowicz - 30-te urodziny (2008)
 Bracia (Cugowscy) - Fobrock (2005)
 Bracia (Cugowscy) - Dzieci wszystkich gwiazd (2003)

References

1979 births
Living people
21st-century Polish male singers
21st-century Polish singers
Polish pop singers
Polish rock singers